"Pardonne-moi" (English: "Forgive Me") is a 2001 song recorded by French singer-songwriter Mylène Farmer, with lyrics written by herself and music composed by Laurent Boutonnat. It was the third and last single from Les Mots, and was released on 21 October 2002. The song is about the unhappy love of a woman who is asking for forgiveness from the Oriental princes whom she loves. The black and white accompanying music video was directed by Boutonnat in Morocco and shows Farmer dressed as a nun, with images of a knight galloping on horseback and a snake. Like the single "À quoi je sers..." released thirteen years earlier, "Pardonne-moi" is generally deemed a synthesis of Farmer's work and thus marked the end of an artistic period in her career. The song received positive reviews from critics and became a top ten hit in France and in the Waloon Belgium, although its sales were rather disappointing.

Release
After many hesitations, Polydor began sending promotional CDs to radio stations starting on 3 September 2002 before announcing the song's release as a single on 14 October. The song was finally released the following week. Unlike Farmer's previous songs "Les Mots" and "C'est une belle journée", as well as Kate Ryan's "Désenchantée" cover, "Pardonne-moi" was poorly broadcast on radio, although it enjoyed an extensive advertising campaign on TF1 and M6. The single was issued as CD single in a limited easel edition, and as 12" maxi with a run of 6,000 also copies containing another remix named 'forgiveness club remix'. There was no CD maxi.

Lyrics and music
"Pardonne-moi" uses the imagery of a fairy tale. In the lyrics, Farmer cites various princes to whom she speaks: a Hungarian Prince, Hindu Prince, Arabic Prince, Dawn Prince, and Black Prince. French author Erwan Chuberre said that the lyrics deal with "a love that hurts, the one who was lost without knowing why" and refer to the film Lawrence of Arabia by David Lean. Author Julien Rigal stated that the song is about "the discharge of a woman in love many times neglected because of her too strong love". Journalist Benoît Cachin noted several references to Charles Perrault's fairy tale Sleeping Beauty (La Belle au Bois dormant or The Sleeping Beauty in the Wood). According to biographer Bernard Violet, "Pardonne-moi" has a "deliberately plaintive" music.

Music video
The music video was directed by Laurent Boutonnat, and the screenplay of this Requiem Publishing and Stuffed Monkey production was written both by Mylène Farmer and Boutonnat. Some fans worried that the video would be the continuation of "C'est une belle journée", which was considered irrelevant given the quite different themes of both songs. As the song had several Oriental sonorities, several rumors about the video were divulged in the media, saying it would be filmed in Morocco during the singer's vacations in September 2002. The video was eventually shot in two days in Stains, France, and cost about 40,000 euros, making it one of the singer's least expensive videos. It features a horse, which gallops on a treadmill to give the impression that it does not move forward, and a snake, which belongs to Farmer, both of which were bought in Morocco.

The video was produced in black and white and deals with religion. It features Farmer, dressed as a nun, praying and sometimes performing a dance, surrounded by white smoke. Technically, the video is built on a rapid acceleration of images showing Farmer alternating with images of a closely filmed snake and of a mysterious knight on horseback whose running is accelerating throughout the video. During the refrain, Farmer begs forgiveness with a smoky light coming from above, the display alternating between white eyes and snake-like eyes.

In this video, "Boutonnat seems to sum up the features of Farmer's imagery: total harmony between photography, editing, and sound, but also haunting images at the expense of the narrative, like moments which are thrown on their own ambiance (...). The absence of colors and landscapes, and the several close ups inspire melancholy, almost dread. This feeling is accentuated by certain images of the singer engaged in an epileptic choreography, pretending to struggle in a smoke". Several elements of the video refer to visual effects already used in many of Farmer's previous videos: black and white ("À quoi je sers..."), eyes rolled upwards ("Tristana"), a snake ("Sans logique"), a moon ("Ainsi soit je..."), a horse through a cloud of smoke ("Allan"), some moving sails ("L'Âme-stram-gram"), a smoky camera ("Beyond My Control"), and a succession of zooms and close ups ("Maman a tort"). Thus, many observers saw in these references a conclusive aspect to this video and a summary of the singer's work, like "À quoi je sers..." (which featured characters from many of her earlier videos), 13 years earlier. In spite of these symbolic aspects, the music video was not greatly appreciated by the public because it was considered "too simple and too bland". Rigal deemed the video "aesthetic".

Critical reception
"Pardonne-moi" was generally well received by the media. For example, French magazine Fan2 said the singer "uses ingredients that make her success: an enigmatic voice raised on somber and melancholy lyrics". The melody was described as "sweet and sad", with a "delightful and melancholy lyrics" by Star Club. Télé Magazine deemed that "Pardonne-moi" has an "effective melody", a "evanescent voice" and mysterious lyrics, which can be variously interpreted. Magazine Jukebox described it as a "melancholic" and "tortured" song.

In France, "Pardonne-moi" entered the singles chart at a peak of number six on 26 October, becoming Farmer's 25th top ten hit. However, the single quickly dropped on the chart and totaled six weeks in the top 50 and seventeen weeks on the chart. In Belgium (Wallonia), the single debuted at number thirteen on 6 November on the Ultratop 50, then reached a peak at number seven the week after, and remained in the top 40 for eight weeks. It appeared at number 85 on the Belgian year-end chart. In Switzerland, "Pardonne-moi" debuted at number 53 on 11 November, then dropped and fell off the chart on 26 January 2003, but re-entered directly at a peak of number 45 and eventually totaled eleven weeks in the top 100.

Formats and track listings
These are the formats and track listings of single releases of "Pardonne-moi":

 CD single / CD single – Tryptic

 12" maxi

 CD single – Promo / CD single – Promo – Luxurious limited edition (800)

 VHS – Promo

Official versions

Credits and personnel
These are the credits and the personnel as they appear on the back of the single:
 Mylène Farmer – lyrics
 Laurent Boutonnat – music, production
 Bertrand Chatenet – mixing
 Requiem Publishing – edition
 Polydor – recording company
 Ellen Von Unwerth / H&K – photo
 Henry Neu / Com'N.B – design
 Made in the E.U.

Charts

Peak positions

Year-end charts

Sales

Release history

References

Notes

External links

  Mylène Farmer — "Pardonne-moi" All about the song, on Mylene.net
  "Pardonne-moi", lyrics

2001 songs
2002 singles
Mylène Farmer songs
Songs with lyrics by Mylène Farmer
Songs with music by Laurent Boutonnat
Music videos directed by Laurent Boutonnat